This article is about the list of notable libraries in Hyderabad, Telangana, India.

List of libraries
 Archaeological Museum Library is located at Gunfundry, Opposite Lepakshi, Near Abids.
 British Library is established in 1979 and located at Rd No. 36 Jubilee Hills.
 JustBooks clc India's largest community library chain located at Miyapur, Kukatpally, Gachibowli, Karkhana, Jubilee Hills Hyderabad.
 InkReaders, Hyderabad Online book lending library at Kondapur Hyderabad.
 City Central Library established in 1960 is located at Chikkadpally.
 Indo American Studies Centre for International Studies is located at Osmania University Campus.
 Osmania University Library is located at Osmania University campus.
 Children's Library at Kea Brainery is located at Himayathnagar Street No 18
Jawaharlal Nehru Technological University Library is located at JNTU Hyderabad campus.
 State Central Library is located at Afzal Gunj is established in 1891 by Nawab Imad-ul-Mulk. It was formerly known as Asafia Library.
 Vivekananda Library is located at RamaKrishna Math campus, Domalguda.
 National Institute of Micro, Small and Medium Enterprises Library is located at NI-MSME campus at Yusufguda, Hyderabad is one of the exhaustive and reputed libraries in the city.
 Elite Library for competitive exams in tarnaka, secunderabad
 Sri Krishna Devaraya Andhra Bhasha Nilayam is perhaps the oldest non-Government Library in the State of Andhra Pradesh established in 1901.
 Sundarayya Vignana Kendram is established in 1988 and located at Baglingampally.
 Telugu University Library located at the NCC end of Osmania University Campus
 Idara E Adabiyat E Urdu Library located at Aiwan-e-Urdu, Panjagutta established in 1945.
 Sundarayya Vijnana Kendram, Gachibowli.

References

External links
 JustBooks clc, India's largest community library chain.
 InkReaders Online book lending library
 Hyderabad's British Council Library dons an e-avatar
 National Institute of Micro, Small and Medium Enterprises(NIMSME)
 List of Libraries in Hyderabad

Hyderabad
Libraries
Libraries in Hyderabad